Sanjay Gandhi Jaivik Udyan (also known as Sanjay Gandhi Biological Park) or Patna Zoo is located off Bailey Road in Patna, Bihar, India. The park was opened to the public as a zoo in 1973. The park is Patna's most frequented picnic spot, with more than 36,000 visitors on New Year's Day alone in 2022.

History
The park was first established as a botanical garden in 1969. The then Governor of Bihar, Sri Nityanand Kanungo, provided almost  of land from the Governor House campus for the garden. In 1972, Public Works added  to this, and the Revenue Department transferred  to the Forest Department to help expand the park.

Since 1973, this park has been a biological park, combining a botanical garden with a zoo. The land acquired from the Public Works Department and the Revenue Department was declared protected forest by the state government on 8 March 1983.

Animals and exhibits
The zoo is currently home to over 800 animals of about 110 species, including tiger, leopard, clouded leopard, hippopotamus, crocodile, elephants, Himalayan black bear, jackal, black bucks, spotted deer, peafowl, hill myna, gharial, python, Indian rhinoceros, chimpanzee, giraffe, zebra, emu, and white peacock.

Having started as a botanical garden, the park currently houses more than 300 species of trees, herbs and shrubs. Plant exhibits include a nursery for medicinal plants, an orchid house, a fern house, a glass house, and a rose garden.

The park also includes an aquarium which is the largest revenue generator after the general admission fee. The aquarium has about 35 species of fish, and the snake house has 32 snakes belonging to 5 species.

Conservation and births
The Patna Zoo makes considerable effort to conserve and propagate endangered species from around the world. Breeding captive wild animals is a difficult challenge that the zoo has met with some notable success.

Success
 The great one-horned rhinoceros has been bred successfully several times in the past. In 2008, Patna Zoo earned acclaim for its breeding techniques.
 A hippopotamus has given birth for the first time at the zoo to a male hippo on 19 April 2001. There have been several other hippo births since, including in 2007.
 A leopard gave birth to two cubs on 18 June 2001, after a gap of 16 years since the last birth.
 An alligator has bred for the first time in the zoo on 29 June 2001 and after that several time in past. The number of gharials or alligators here have gone up from 13 to 129 in the last five years.
 A porcupine bred for the first time in the zoo on 12 June 2001 and gave birth to two baby porcupines.

Initiative
 The zoo received a white tiger in the first week of March from Nandan Kanan Zoo, Bhubaneshwar. This has improved the chances of breeding the tiger in the zoo.
 There is a single male zebra in the zoo. It is expected that a female zebra will arrive in the zoo if the Central Zoo Authority approves the proposal.

Birds
This place provides a good sighting for birders.

Gallery

See also
 List of botanical gardens in India
 Patna

References

External links

 

1973 establishments in Bihar
Zoos in India
Tourist attractions in Patna
Buildings and structures in Patna
Gardens in India
Zoos established in 1973